Siv Mossleth  (born 4 April 1967) is a Norwegian politician. She was elected representative to the Storting for the period 2017–2021 for the Centre Party, from the constituency of Nordland. She was re-elected to the Storting for the period 2021–2025.

Mossleth is an agronomist by education.

References

1967 births
Living people
Centre Party (Norway) politicians
Members of the Storting
Nordland politicians